Terrance Kelly (born March 28, 1971), known professionally as Mr. Cheeks, is an American rapper best known for his work with the musical group Lost Boyz, and as a solo artist with the single "Lights, Camera, Action!".

Biography

1991–2019: Lost Boyz
Mr. Cheeks, who was mentored by his uncle Gil Scott-Heron, along with bandmates Freaky Tah (1971–1999), Spigg Nice and Pretty Lou made up The Lost Boyz. The Lost Boyz practiced a sincere, literate, non-sensational style of New York hip-hop and produced a number of singles including; "Lifestyles of the Rich and Shameless" (1994), "Jeeps, Lex Coups, Bimaz & Benz" (1995) and "Renee" (1996). Lost Boyz gained worldwide critical acclaim following the release of the albums; Legal Drug Money in 1996, Love, Peace & Nappiness in 1997,LB IV Life in 1999 , LB Next Generation in 2019 and Legacy in 2020.

2001–09: Solo career
Mr. Cheeks became a solo artist in 2001. His debut solo album, John P. Kelly, named for both his cousin and his grandfather, featured the hit single "Lights, Camera, Action!". The album also included a collaboration with longtime friend and business partner, Stephen Marley, (son of reggae artist Bob Marley) featuring the ballad "Till We Meet Again" (recorded in Freaky Tah's memory) and the reggae-flavored "Mama Say”. In 2003, Mr. Cheeks released the follow-up album, Back Again! The single off the album was "Crush On You" and it featured Mario Winans. In the fall of 2003, Cheeks separated from Universal, forming his own label, Diane’s Boyz.  Cheeks was also featured on Lil' Kim's single, "The Jump Off."

Discography

Solo albums
John P. Kelly (2001)
Back Again! (2003)
Ladies and Ghettomen (2004)
Raised (2015)

with Lost Boyz

Legal Drug Money (1996)
Love, Peace & Nappiness (1997)
LB IV Life (1999)
Next Generation (2019)
Legacy (2020)

Solo singles

 "Lights, Camera, Action!" (2001)
 "Friday Night" (2002)
 "Crush on You" (2003)
 "What We Do" (2006)

Featured singles
 112 — "Come See Me" (1996)
 Lil' Kim — "The Jump Off" (2003)

References

External links

Mr. Cheeks on Facebook

1971 births
African-American male rappers
Living people
People from Queens, New York
Rappers from New York City
21st-century American rappers
21st-century American male musicians
American radio personalities
21st-century African-American musicians
20th-century African-American people